So Sudden is the debut album of The Hush Sound. It was first released independently during early 2005. It was re-released after the band signed to Decaydance Records, Fall Out Boy's Pete Wentz's independent record label.

Track listing
All songs written by Bob Morris and Greta Salpeter, except where noted.
"City Traffic Puzzle" (3:29)
"Weeping Willow" (2:17)
"Crawling Towards the Sun" (2:57)
"The Artist" (3:36)
"Unsafe Safe" (3:34)
"Momentum" (3:32)
"Hourglass" (2:37)
"Echo" (4:59)
"My Apologies" (2:16)
"The Market" (Morris, Chris Faller) (1:54)
"Tides Change" (1:22)
"Carry Me Home" (2:17)
"Eileen" (3:31)

Personnel
Bob Morris - vocals, guitar
Chris Faller - bass, backing vocals
Darren Wilson - drums, backing vocals
Greta Salpeter - piano, vocals

Recording
So Sudden was recorded at The Gallery of Carpet Studios in Villa Park, IL with owner/engineer/producer Brian Zieske.
"The Artist", the fourth track, contains many allusions to Oscar Wilde's The Picture of Dorian Gray, primarily the prologue.  The thirteenth track, "Eileen", also contains an allusion to Robert Herrick’s poem "To the Virgins, to Make Much of Time".

2005 debut albums
The Hush Sound albums
Fueled by Ramen albums